Hela världen för mig is a 2003 single by Sanna Nielsen and written by Thomas G:son.

Release
"Hela världen för mig" peaked at #35 in the Swedish singles chart and continued to appear for 35 weeks. It was the fourth most successful song of 2003 in the Svensktoppen charts. Nielsen shared that the song described her feelings as a student. It was entered into Melodifestivalen 2003 and reached the semifinals in Gothenburg on 22 February 2003 before being sent directly to the Stockholm Globe Arena for the finals. The song ranked fifth in the competition.

Single track listing
Hela världen för mig – 3:01
All That It Takes – 3:02

Charts

References

External links
Information at Svensk mediedatabas

2003 singles
2003 songs
Sanna Nielsen songs
Songs written by Thomas G:son
Melodifestivalen songs of 2003
Swedish-language songs